Bashera, also spelt Bashira is a village in the Punjab province of Pakistan.

Populated places in Sahiwal District